Big Creek Bridge 2 is located northeast of Madrid, Iowa, United States. The Marsh arch bridge was designed by Des Moines engineer James B. Marsh in February 1917. The contract to build the structure was awarded in April of the same year to the N.E. Marsh & Son Construction Company of Des Moines for $3,170. It was completed later in 1917. The bridge was listed on the National Register of Historic Places in 1998.

References

Bridges completed in 1917
Bridges in Boone County, Iowa
Arch bridges in Iowa
Road bridges on the National Register of Historic Places in Iowa
National Register of Historic Places in Boone County, Iowa